Zuppa may refer to:

Soups
 Zuppa pavese
 Zuppa toscana
 Zuppa alla modenese

People with the surname
Vjeran Zuppa (born 1940), Croatian intellectual, writer and poet

See also
 Zuppa Inglese, an Italian dessert